"Theme from Norefjell" is an instrumental composition by Dutch disc jockey and producer DJ Tiësto. It was released in 1999 in the Netherlands. It was composed during a trip to Norway. The Magikal Remake was included on DJ Tiësto's compilation, Magik Three: Far from Earth. A remix of the track by DJ Jan and Christophe Chantzis can be found on Live at Innercity: Amsterdam RAI (1999) and Tiësto in Concert (2003).

Track listing 
 12" / Digital Download (Netherlands)
 "Theme From Norefjell" (Magikal Remake) - 6:24
 "Theme From Norefjell" (DJ Jan & Christophe Chantzis Mix) - 5:26

 CD (Netherlands)
 "Theme From Norefjell" (Magikal Radio Edit) - 3:27
 "Theme From Norefjell" (Magikal Remake) - 6:30
 "Theme From Norefjell" (DJ Jan & Christophe Chantzis Mix) - 5:25

 12" (US)
 "Theme From Norefjell" (DJ Jan & Christophe Chantzis Mix) - 5:26
 "Theme From Norefjell" (Lambert & Dimech Mix) - 7:56
 "Theme From Norefjell" (DJ Tiësto's Magikal Remake) - 6:24
 "Theme From Norefjell" (Aptness Remix) - 8:09

 12" (UK)
 "Theme From Norefjell" (Aptness Remix) - 8:09
 "Theme From Norefjell" (Magikal Remake) - 6:24
 "Theme From Norefjell" (Lambert & Dimech Mix) - 7:56
 "Theme From Norefjell" (DJ Jan & Christophe Chantzis Mix) - 5:26

 Digital download - DJ Cor Fijneman 2004 Remix (Netherlands)
 "Theme From Norefjell" (DJ Cor Fijneman 2004 Remix) - 8:38

Charts

References 

1999 songs
1999 singles
Tiësto songs
Songs written by Tiësto